The Isuzu Reach is a walk-through van built atop an Isuzu NPR chassis, with a body developed by Utilimaster. It was first presented in March 2011 at the National Truck Equipment Association's "Work Truck Show". The van is only sold in North America, where it is also assembled.

Design

The Reach uses the Isuzu NPR's ladder chassis and also the three-litre 4JJ1-TC diesel engine used in the NPR Eco-Max. The body is a full walk-through design developed by Utilimaster, and offers the buyer the choice of swing-out rear doors or a roll-up unit. Both UPS and FedEx use the Reach for city delivery work. Two lengths are available on a single wheelbase, offering cargo volumes of either .

Aftermarket power-train company XL Hybrids announced a hybrid-electric version of the Reach in March 2015 for the Work Truck Show in Indianapolis, using their XL3 Hybrid Electric Drive System.

References

External links

Isuzu Reach page (USA)

Reach
Front-wheel-drive vehicles
Cab over vehicles
Vans
2010s cars
Motor vehicles manufactured in the United States
Vehicles introduced in 2011